"Shake It" is a song recorded by Greek singer Sakis Rouvas, written by Nikos Terzis and Nektarios Tirakis. It is best known as the  entry at the Eurovision Song Contest 2004, in Istanbul.

Background
The song is an up-tempo number, fully in English language, with Rouvas telling his lover that "I would trade my life for a night with you" and asking the lover to "shake it" for him. The lyrics were somewhat controversial as it was thought to be about sex, with "shake it" referring to the wiggling movements of the male genitalia. Rouvas declined these claims. The music – by Nikos Terzis – also features some traditional Greek instrumentation as well as the heavy dance beats increasingly prominent at the Contest.

Eurovision

The performance was similarly sexualised, with Rouvas beginning by dancing with two girls wearing suits. As he sang the line "my world's on fire", he pulled red scarves from the trousers of his backing dancers. Later, he removed the suits from his dancers, revealing skimpy gold costumes. They later returned the favour by tearing his white jacket from him at the start of the final chorus, leaving him wearing a singlet and jeans. Live recordings of the performance feature loud cheers from the crowd as well as audible panting from Rouvas at the end of his athletic dance routine.

Semi-final
As Greece had not finished in the top 10 at the 2003 contest, the song was first performed in the semi-final. Here, it was performed tenth, following 's Maryon with "Notre Planète" and preceding 's Ruslana with "Wild Dances". At the close of voting, it had received 238 points, placing 3rd in the 22-strong field and qualifying for the final.

Final
In the final, it was performed sixteenth, following 's Toše Proeski with "Life" and preceding 's Jónsi with "Heaven". At the close of voting, it had received 252 points, placing 3rd in a field of 24. It was succeeded as the Greek representative at the 2005 contest by Elena Paparizou with "My Number One", which would secure Greece's first win in the contest. Incidentally, Shake It's score was 22 points higher than "My Number One"'s, despite its lower placing.

After Eurovision
, Greece hosted the contest, and Rouvas was asked to co-present it. He made a slight reference to his performance when asked by co-host Maria Menounos how he had felt waiting for the results to be known. He told her that "I was shaking... brrrrrr... all over", prompting cheers from some of the audience.

Track listing
"Shake It" (Eurovision Version)
"Shake It" (Club Remix by Nick Terzis)
"Shake It" (Soumka Mix)
"Shake It" (Marsheaux Radio Mix)
"Shake It" (Radio Version)

Music video
The music video was directed by successful Greek director Kostas Kapetanidis, assisted by the production label Cream. The director had collaborated with Rouvas for the first time in 1995 for the video of the song "Ela Mou" and had produced many other popular videos for him since. The video itself was shot on the Greek island of Santorini, and features Rouvas singing in the water. The storyline was uncomplicated, featuring Rouvas and friends dancing and having a good time, with its objective being to put emphasis on the song's summer feeling through the dramatic natural beauty of the setting, representing a Greek identity. At the beginning, there is an advertisement for Vodafone, with the name of the mobile company being written on a faraway yacht in the sea. The video consists of eight scenes, while Rouvas can be seen changing outfits five times. The video for "Shake It" was one of the most-played videos of that year according to MAD TV and remains one of Rouvas' most successful videos.

Release history 
This album has been released with the Copy Control protection system in some regions.

Chart performance
"Shake It" was a successful song in both Greece and Cyprus, peaking at the top of both countries' charts for several weeks, while charting in a number of neighboring countries. It peaked at number one on both the Greek singles and airplay charts for nearly one year, making it one of the longest-charting songs in Greek music history. Being certified 4× platinum, it is considered to be one of the most successful CD singles in Greek history. The single also managed to gain success in further regions of Europe, such as Sweden, where it broke the Top 40 on the national singles chart, charting for one week at number 32.

Charts

Awards

Eurovision Song Contest
3rd Place (252 points)

Arion Music Awards
Best Pop Song (Nominated)
Video of the Year (Nominated)
Male Artist of the Year (Nominated)
Best-Selling Greek Single of the Year (Won)

MAD Video Music Awards 2004
Sexiest Appearance in a Video (Nominated)

Johnnie Walker's Men of the Year Awards
Singer of the Year (Won)

World Music Awards 2005
World's Best-Selling Greek Artist (Won)

See also
Greece in the Eurovision Song Contest

References

External links
Official site

2004 singles
Sakis Rouvas songs
Eurovision songs of Greece
Eurovision songs of 2004
English-language Greek songs
Music videos directed by Kostas Kapetanidis
Number-one singles in Greece
Songs written by Nikos Terzis
2004 songs
Minos EMI singles